Magdalene Schauss-Flake (25 July 1921 – 24 September 2008) was a German composer and organist who gave recitals throughout the United States and Europe.

Biography
Schauss-Flake was born in Essen, where she studied church music at the Folkwang School while working as a jazz musician in bars. Her teachers included Hans Chemin-Petit, Siegfried Reda, and Ludwig Weber. She married a minister named Schauss and they had three children. Schauss-Flake taught at a music academy in Szczecin, Poland, and worked as a church musician in Germany in Anklam, Essen-Altendorf, and Essen-Kupferdreh. She gave organ recitals throughout the United States and Europe. She is buried in Burgsponheim, Germany.

Schauss-Flake’s works have been recorded commercially on LPs by Capella 3 (today known as Cantate); Carus-Verlag; Lauda; and MDG (Musikproduktion Dabringhaus Und Grimm). Her compositions are published by Carus-Verlag, Presto Music, Strube Musikverlag, and Tezak Verlag. Her works include:

Chamber 

Serenade (4 trombones)
Suite in G (brass and woodwinds)
Variationen ueber das Lied ‘es ist ein Schnitter (trombone and narrator)
Variationen ueber ein Thema von Anton Dvorak (trumpet and trombone)

Vocal 

“Befiehl dem Herrn deine Wege”
Der Morgensternn ist aufgedrungen (soprano, choir, and 6 wind instruments; text by Daniel Rumpius) 
“Du meine Seele singe”
“Jauchzet dem Herrn, alle Welt” (Psalm 100) 
“Jauchzet, ihr Himmel”
“Nun lasst uns Goot, dem Herrn”
Ohren gabst du mir (choir; text by Paul Ernst Ruppel)

References

External links
Hear music by Magdalene Schauss-Flake

1921 births
2008 deaths
German women composers
German organists